Bolandione, also known as 19-norandrostenedione, as well as 19-norandrost-4-en-3,17-dione or estr-4-ene-3,17-dione, is a precursor of the anabolic-androgenic steroid (AAS) nandrolone (19-nortestosterone). Until 2005, bolandione was available without prescription in United States, where it was marketed as a prohormone, but it is now classified as a Schedule III drug. It is also banned from use in many sports, including the Olympic Games, under the World Anti-Doping Code. Bolandione is readily metabolized to nandrolone after oral administration, but its potency to transactivate the androgen receptor dependent reporter gene expression is 10 times lower as compared to dihydrotestosterone (DHT).

Scientific studies have shown that oral administration of bolandione is "a very ineffective strategy for stimulating skeletal muscle mass increases but may be associated with side effects".

In vivo experiments in castrated rats demonstrated that subcutaneous treatment with bolandione resulted only in a stimulation of the weight of the levator ani muscle, while the prostate and seminal vesicle weights remained completely unaffected. In contrast to its metabolite nandrolone, bolandione highly selectively stimulates the growth of the skeletal muscles but has only weak androgenic properties.

In the early 2000s, contamination of androstenedione products with traces of bolandione caused false positives for doping tests for nandrolone because 19-norandrosterone is a metabolite of both nandrolone and bolandione. In a randomized controlled trial trace contamination of androstenedione with bolandione was sufficient for users of androstenedione to test positive for nandrolone. This detail became less relevant after bolandione and 4-androstenedione were banned by major sporting bodies.

See also
 List of androgens/anabolic steroids

References

Androgens and anabolic steroids
Diketones
Estranes
Estrogens
Prodrugs
Progestogens
World Anti-Doping Agency prohibited substances